The 1924–25 Boston Bruins season was the team's first in the National Hockey League (NHL). Along with the Montreal Maroons, the Bruins were the first expansion franchise in the NHL and the league's first American-based club.  The Bruins finished sixth and last in the league standings.

Offseason

In 1924, Charles Adams, the magnate who owned the First National grocery chain, obtained a NHL expansion franchise for Boston.  The approval was finalized on October 13, 1924, for $15,000, making the Bruins the first NHL team to be based in the United States. Adams' first act was to hire Art Ross, a former star player and innovator, as general manager and coach.

Ross nicknamed the team "Bruins", which also went along with the team's original uniform colors of brown and yellow, which came from Adams' grocery chain.  Most of the Bruins' players for its inaugural season were signed from the Pacific Coast Hockey Association and the Western Canada Hockey League.

The Bruins first saw action in an exhibition game against the Saskatoon Sheiks of the Western Canada Hockey League on November 29, which was then Thanksgiving; it was the first professional match held in Boston Arena.  Boston lost the game 2–1.

Subsequently, leaks in the Arena's cooling system forced the team to practice in Montreal in the runup to the season opener.

Regular season

Despite problems with the ice plant that threatened the home opener  the Bruins started the season out auspiciously, defeating their fellow expansion Maroons squad in a nearly Arena 2–1; the first goal in franchise history was scored by Smokey Harris, while Carson Cooper, who assisted on Harris' goal, scored the game winner. It was the first game the NHL ever played in the United States.

However, Boston lost its next eleven games, as well as having a seven-game losing streak — which included their second home game on December 8, initiating the Bruins' most intense rivalry over time — and finished in the basement.  The Bruins had signed veteran West Coast star goaltender Hec Fowler as their netminder, but behind a weak defense, Fowler and backup Howie Lockhart played very poorly and the Bruins were repeatedly shelled, allowing ten goals in a game twice, one of which saw Toronto player Babe Dye score five goals on December 22.

The signing of senior league star netminder Doc Stewart and the purchase of Lionel Hitchman helped somewhat, but the team was riddled with injuries, and only Jimmy Herbert and Carson Cooper (who spent much of the season hurt) showed any offensive flair.  The team's winning percentage of .200 was the second worst in league history to that date, and remains the tenth worst in NHL history.

The Bruins' debut season home games were played in the only "debut" rink of any of the Original Six NHL teams that has survived into the 21st century — Boston Arena, the world's oldest indoor multi-sports facility that is still used for ice hockey at any level of competition.

Final standings

Record vs. opponents

Schedule and results

Playoffs
The Bruins did not qualify for the playoffs.

Player statistics

Leading scorers
Note: GP = Games played; G = Goals; A = Assists; Pts = Points; PIM = Penalty minutes

Goaltenders
Note: GP = Games played; Min = Minutes; W = Wins; L = Losses; T = Ties; GA = Goals against; SO = Shutouts; GAA = Goals against average

Transactions
 November 2, 1924 – Acquired Alf Skinner from Vancouver Maroons (PCHA) for cash
 November 2, 1924  – Acquired Bobby Rowe from Seattle Metropolitans (PCHA) for cash
 December 14, 1924 – Acquired Bill "Red" Stuart from Toronto St. Patricks for cash
 December 17, 1924 – Released Bobby Rowe
 December 19, 1924 – Acquired George Carroll from Montreal Maroons for the rights to Ernie Parkes
 December 21, 1924 – Traded Smokey Harris to Vancouver Maroons (WCHL) for cash
 January 3, 1925 – Traded Alf Skinner to Montreal Maroons for Bernie Morris and Bob Benson
 January 10, 1925 – Acquired Lionel Hitchman from the Ottawa Senators for cash
 January 18, 1925 – Traded Stan Jackson to Ottawa Senators for cash

See also
1924–25 NHL season

References

Boston Bruins seasons
Boston
Boston
Boston Bruins
Boston Bruins
1920s in Boston